A wine cooler is an alcoholic beverage made from wine and fruit juice, often in combination with a carbonated beverage and sugar.

Traditionally home-made, wine coolers have been bottled and sold by commercial distributors since the early 1980s, especially in areas where their alcohol content, lower than wine, causes them to come under less restrictive laws than table wines. Because most of the flavor in the wine is obscured by the fruit and sugar, the wine used in wine coolers tends to be of the cheapest available grade. Since January 1991, when the United States Congress quintupled the excise tax on wine, most producers of wine coolers dropped wine from the mix, substituting it with cheaper malt liquor. These malt-based coolers, while sometimes referred to as "wine coolers", are in a different category of beverage—sometimes called "malt beverage", "malternative", or just "cooler". Bartles & Jaymes refers to its malt beverage as a "flavored malt cooler".

In Germany, wine coolers became popular in 2004, when the German government imposed an extra duty on alcopops (pre-mixed spirits) of 0.80 to 0.90 euro per bottle, effective 1 August 2004. To circumvent higher taxation, some German producers have switched to wine coolers, which are being marketed in the same way as alcopops.

See also

 Alcopop
 Malternative
 Mimosa
 Kir (cocktail)
 Sangria
 Spritzer
 Tinto de verano
 Wine

References
 

Premixed alcoholic drinks